Charles J. "Hack" Schumann (August 13, 1884 – March 25, 1946) was an American Major League Baseball pitcher. He played for the Philadelphia Athletics during the  season.

References

Major League Baseball pitchers
Philadelphia Athletics players
Baseball players from Buffalo, New York
1884 births
1946 deaths